Parasipyloidea seiferti is a species of phasmid or stick insect of the genus Parasipyloidea. It is found in Sri Lanka. It is first described from Nuwara Eliya.

References

Phasmatodea
Insects of Asia
Insects described in 2002